Notable people with the surname Mantia include:

Bryan Mantia, drummer of Guns N' Roses and other rock bands
Joey Mantia, American speed skater
Simone Mantia, Italian/American baritone horn, euphonium, and trombone player
Simona La Mantia, Italian triple jumper

Surnames of Italian origin